Drum (Welsh: Y Drum = the ridge) is a summit in the Carneddau mountains in Wales, 2 km north-east of Foel-fras. It is 771 m (2,526 ft) high. It is also known as Carnedd Penyborth-Goch.

Its eastern slopes are drained by the Afon Tafolog, a tributary of Afon Roe which flows through the village of Rowen before joining the River Conwy.

See also 
 Blue Joker, an experimental airborne early-warning radar, tested from a site high on the mountain in 1956

References

Mountains and hills of Snowdonia
Hewitts of Wales
Nuttalls
Mountains and hills of Conwy County Borough
Mountains and hills of Gwynedd
Abergwyngregyn
Caerhun